Diasporidion is a genus of beetles in the family Cerambycidae, containing the following species:

 Diasporidion argentinense (Martins, 1962)
 Diasporidion duplicatum (Gounelle, 1909)

References

Ibidionini